is a French term coined by Jacques Derrida. It is a central concept in Derrida's deconstruction, a critical outlook concerned with the relationship between text and meaning. The term  means "difference and deferral of meaning."

Overview
Derrida first uses the term  in his 1963 paper "". The term  then played a key role in Derrida's engagement with the philosophy of Edmund Husserl in Speech and Phenomena. The term was then elaborated in various other works, notably in his essay "" and in various interviews collected in Positions.

This misspelling highlights the fact that its written form is not heard, and serves to further subvert the traditional privileging of speech over writing (see arche-writing and logocentrism), as well as the distinction between the sensible and the intelligible. This is because the language of understanding is already caught up in sensible metaphors—for example,  means "to see" in Ancient Greek.

In the essay "" Derrida indicates that  gestures at a number of heterogeneous features that govern the production of textual meaning. The first (relating to deferral) is the notion that words and signs can never fully summon forth what they mean, but can only be defined through appeal to additional words, from which they differ. Thus, meaning is forever "deferred" or postponed through an endless chain of signifiers. The second (relating to difference, sometimes referred to as espacement or "spacing") concerns the force that differentiates elements from one another, and in so doing engenders binary oppositions and hierarchies that underpin meaning itself.

Derrida developed the concept of  deeper in the course of an argument against the phenomenology of Husserl, who sought a rigorous analysis of the role of memory and perception in our understanding of sequential items such as music or language. Derrida's approach argues that because the perceiver's mental state is constantly in flux and differs from one re-reading to the next, a general theory describing this phenomenon is unachievable.

Between structure and genesis 
Derrida approaches texts as constructed around elemental oppositions which all speech has to articulate if it intends to make any sense whatsoever. This is so because identity is viewed in non-essentialist terms as a construct, and because constructs only produce meaning through the interplay of differences inside a "system of distinct signs". This approach to text, in a broad sense, emerges from semiology advanced by Ferdinand de Saussure.

Saussure is considered one of the fathers of structuralism when he explained that terms get their meaning in reciprocal determination with other terms inside language:

Saussure explicitly suggested linguistics was only a branch of a more general semiology, of a science of signs in general, being human codes only one among others. Nevertheless, in the end, as Derrida pointed out, he made of linguistics "the regulatory model", and "for essential, and essentially metaphysical, reasons had to privilege speech, and everything that links the sign to phone": Derrida will prefer to follow the more "fruitful paths (formalization)" of a general semiotics without falling in what he considered "a hierarchizing teleology" privileging linguistics, and speak of 'mark' rather than of language, not as something restricted to mankind, but as prelinguistic, as the pure possibility of language, working everywhere there is a relation to something else.

Derrida sees these differences as elemental oppositions working in all languages, systems of distinct signs, and codes, where terms don't have absolute meanings but instead draw meaning from reciprocal determination with other terms.

But structural difference will not be considered without him already destabilizing from the start its static, synchronic, taxonomic, ahistoric motifs, remembering that all structure already refers to the generative movement in the play of differences:

This confirms the subject as not present to itself and constituted on becoming space, in temporizing and also, as Saussure said, that "language [which consists only of differences] is not a function of the speaking subject":

Questioned this myth of the presence of meaning in itself ("objective") and/or for itself ("subjective") Derrida will start a long deconstruction of all texts where conceptual oppositions are put to work in the actual construction of meaning and values based on the subordination of the movement of "":

But, as Derrida also points out, these relations with other terms express not only meaning but also values. The way elemental oppositions are put to work in all texts it is not only a theoretical operation but also a practical option.
The first task of deconstruction, starting with philosophy and afterwards revealing it operating in literary texts, juridical texts, etc., would be to overturn these oppositions:

It is not that the final task of deconstruction is to surpass all oppositions. For they are structurally necessary to produce sense; they simply cannot be suspended once and for all. But this does not obviate their need to be analyzed and criticized in all its manifestations, showing the way these oppositions, logical and axiological, are at work in all discourse for it to be able to produce meaning and values.

Illustration 
For example, the word "house" derives its meaning more as a function of how it differs from "shed", "mansion", "hotel", "building", etc. (Form of Content, which Louis Hjelmslev distinguished from Form of Expression) than how the word "house" may be tied to a certain image of a traditional house (i.e. the relationship between signifier and signified) with each term being established in reciprocal determination with the other terms than by an ostensive description or definition.

When can we talk about a "house" or a "mansion" or a "shed"? The same can be said about verbs, in all the world languages: when should we stop saying "walk" and start saying "run"? The same happens, of course, with adjectives: when must we stop saying "yellow" and start saying "orange", or stop defining as "black" and start saying "white", or "rich" and "poor", "entrepreneur" and "worker", "civilized" and "primitive", "man" and "animal", "beast" and "sovereign", "christian" and "pagan", or "beautiful" and start saying "ugly", or "bad" and start saying "good", or "truth" and start saying "false", "determined" and "free"? Or "in" and "out", "here" and "there", "now" and "then", "past" and "present" and "future" and "eternal"? Not only are the topological differences between the words relevant here, but the differentials between what is signified is also covered by différance. Deferral also comes into play, as the words that occur following "house" or "white" in any expression will revise the meaning of that word, sometimes dramatically so. This is true not only with syntagmatic succession in relation with paradigmatic simultaneity, but also, in a broader sense, between diachronic succession in History related with synchronic simultaneity inside a "system of distinct signs".

Thus, complete meaning is always "differential" and postponed in language; there is never a moment when meaning is complete and total. A simple example would consist of looking up a given word in a dictionary, then proceeding to look up the words found in that word's definition, etc., also comparing with older dictionaries from different periods in time, and such a process would never end.

This is also true with all ontological oppositions and its many declensions, not only in philosophy as in human sciences in general, cultural studies, theory of Law, et cetera. For example: the intelligible and the sensible, the spontaneous and the receptive, autonomy and heteronomy, the empirical and the transcendental, immanent and transcendent, as the interior and exterior, or the founded and the founder, normal and abnormal, phonetic and writing, analysis and synthesis, the literal sense and figurative meaning in language, reason and madness in psychiatry, the masculine and feminine in gender theory, man and animal in ecology, the beast and the sovereign in the political field, theory and practice as distinct dominions of thought itself. In all speeches in fact (and by right) we can make clear how they were dramatized, how the cleavages were made during the centuries, each author giving it different centers and establishing different hierarchies between the terms in the opposition.

Paradox 
It may seem contradictory to suggest that  is neither a word nor a concept. The difference itself between words cannot only be another word. If that is the case then  appeals to ontology, creating an even bigger problem. So  is either an appeal to an infinite mystery (similar to God in theology) or becomes empty of any and all meaning and is thus rendered superfluous.

The web of language 
We reside, according to this philosophy, in a web of language, or at least one of interpretation, that has been laid down by tradition and which shifts each time we hear or read an utterance—even if it is the same utterance.  and deconstruction are attempts to understand this web of language, to search, in Derrida's words, for the "other of language". This "other of language" is close to what Anglophone Philosophy calls the Reference of a word. There is a deferment of meaning with each act of re-reading. There is a difference of readings with each re-reading. In Derrida's words, "there is nothing outside the [con]text" of a word's use and its place in the lexicon. Text, in Derrida's parlance, refers to context and includes all about the "real-life" situation of the speech/text (cf. speech act theory).

Temporal delay 
For Derrida, the relationship between the Signifier and the Signified is not understood to be exactly like Saussure's. For Derrida, there was a deferral, a continual and indefinite postponement as the Signified can never be achieved. The formation of the linguistic sign is marked by movement, and is not static. The easiest way to understand this is to imagine Saussure's model as a two dimensional plane, where each signified is separated due to the difference in its sound image. (If two sound-images are exactly alike, one could not distinguish between the two.) Each signifier then would be a particular point. Derrida adds a third dimension, time. Now, the act of formation is accounted for. This is not to say that there is no relationship between the two. However, Derrida felt that the old model focused too heavily on the signifier, rather than on utterance and occurrence. The Signifier and the Signified are severed completely and irrevocably.

Example of word introduction 
An example of this effect occurred in England during the Renaissance, when oranges began to be imported from the Mediterranean. Yellow and red came to be differentiated from a new colour term, "orange". What was the meaning of these words before 1600? – What is their meaning afterwards? Such effects go on often in the use of language and frequently this effect forms the basis of language/meaning. Such changes of meaning are also often centres of political violence, as is apparent in the differences invested in male/female, master/slave, citizen/foreigner etc. Derrida seeks to modulate and question these "violent hierarchies" through deconstruction.

Perhaps it is a misconception that  seeks contradictory meanings. It does not necessarily do so. It can, but what it usually describes is the re-experience, the re-arrival of the moment of reading. Roland Barthes remarked that "those who fail to reread are obliged to read the same story everywhere". This wry comment summarizes the phenomenon of different experience for each iteration.

We are discussing just one text—every text. No distinction is necessarily made between texts in this "basic" level. The difference/deferral can be between one text and itself, or between two texts; this is the crucial distinction between traditional perspectives and deconstruction.

Deconstruction and the history of philosophy
Derrida's neographism (rather than neologism because "neologism" would propose a logos, a metaphysical category; and (more simply) because, when uttered in French, "" is indistinguishable from "difference"—it is thus only a graphical modification, having nothing to do with a spoken logos) is, of course, not just an attempt at linguistics or to discuss written texts and how they are read. It is, most importantly, an attempt to escape the history of metaphysics; a history that has always prioritised certain concepts, e.g., those of substance, essence, soul, spirit (idealism), matter (realism), becoming, freedom, sense-experience, language, science etc. All such ideas imply self-presence and totality. Différance, instead, focuses on the play of presence and absence, and, in effecting a concentration of certain thinking, Derrida takes on board the thought of Freud's unconscious (the trace), Heidegger's destruction of ontotheology, Nietzsche's play of forces, and Bataille's notion of sacrifice in contrast to Hegel's .

Yet he does not approach this absence and loss with the nostalgia that marks Heidegger's attempt to uncover some original truths beneath the accretions of a false metaphysics that have accumulated since Socrates. Rather it is with the moods of play and affirmation that Derrida approaches the issue.

However, Derrida himself never claimed to have escaped from the metaphysics with what he has done. To the contrary, he criticises others for claiming to have demolished metaphysics thoroughly.

Negative theology 

Derrida's non-concept of différance, resembles, but is not, negative theology, an attempt to present a tacit metaphysics without pointing to any existent essence as the first cause or transcendental signified. Following his presentation of his paper "" in 1968, Derrida was faced with an annoyed participant who said, "It [différance] is the source of everything and one cannot know it: it is the God of negative theology." Derrida's answer was, "It is and it is not."

In contrast to negative theology, which posits something supereminent and yet concealed and ineffable,  is not quite transcendental, never quite "real", as it is always and already deferred from being made present. As John Caputo writes, " is but a quasi-transcendental anteriority, not a supereminent, transcendental ulteriority." The differences and deferrings of différance, Derrida points out, are not merely ideal, they are not inscribed in the contours of the brain nor do they fall from the sky, the closest approximation would be to consider them as historical, that is, if the word history itself did not mean what it does, the airbrushing speech of the victor/vanquished.

Derrida has shown an interest in negative or apophatic theology, one of his most important works on the topic being his essay "Sauf le nom".

Life and technics 
In Of Grammatology, Derrida states that grammatology is not a "science of man" because it is concerned with the question of "the name of man." This leads Derrida into a consideration of the work of André Leroi-Gourhan, and in particular his concepts of "program," "exteriorisation," and "liberation of memory." Derrida thus explicitly refers the term  to life, and in particular to life as the history of inscription and retention, whether this is genetic or technological (from writing to "electronic card indexes"). And thus grammatology is not a science of man because it deconstructs any anthropocentrism, in the sense that the inscription in question falls on both sides of the divide human/non-human.

Yet, in the article "", Derrida refers  not to physis, that is, life, but to "all the others of physis—tekhnè, nomos, thesis, society, freedom, history, mind, etc.—as physis differed and deferred, or as physis differing and deferring." Bernard Stiegler argues in his book, Technics and Time, 1, that this represents a hesitation in Derrida: "Now phusis as life was already différance. There is an indecision, a passage remaining to be thought. At issue is the specificity of the temporality of life in which life is inscription in the nonliving, spacing, temporalisation, differentiation, and deferral by, of and in the nonliving, in the dead." What this suggests to Stiegler is that grammatology—a logic of the —must be supplemented with a history of grammatisation, a history of all the forms and techniques of inscription, from genetics to technics, each stage of which will be found to possess its own logic. Only in this way can  be thought as the differing and deferral of life (life as the emergence of a difference from non-life, specifically as the deferral of entropy), and as the difference from physis through which the human must inevitably be defined (the human as the inauguration of another memory, neither the memory of genetics nor that of the individual, but rather a memory consisting in "inscription in the nonliving," that is, technical memory).

Notes

References
"Speech and Phenomena" and other essays on Husserl's Theory of Signs, trans. David B. Allison (Evanston: Northwestern University Press, 1973).
Of Grammatology (Baltimore: Johns Hopkins University Press, 1998, corrected edition).

External links
Full text of  chapter, translated by Alan Bass, from Margins of Philosophy pp. 3–27 (Stanford University)

Deconstruction
Concepts in the philosophy of language
French words and phrases
Literary concepts